Yuen is a Cantonese Chinese surname, which can refer to:

袁, 阮, 元, 源, 原 and 苑

Yuan (surname), the Pinyin transliteration of the Han Chinese surnames 袁, 元, 源, 原 and 苑
Ruan (surname), the Pinyin transliteration of the Han Chinese surname 阮
Chinese yuan, the basic unit of currency in China

See also
Yuen gongwon (UN Park), a burial ground for United Nations Command casualties of the Korean War
Yuen Poovarawan, Thai computer scientist (Yuen as a given name)
Yuan (disambiguation)